Phranakorn Film Co. Ltd. is a movie studio in Thailand. It was established in 2001 by a family owned group that runs the Thana Cineplex movie-theater chain. The private company is operated by the founder and chief executive officer Manot Thanarungroj.

Company Profile

Introduction
Phranakorn film is one of the leading companies in Thai film business. For many years, the company has owned local theatres in multiple provinces in Thailand. Since 2001, the company is growing by producing more 20 films to both local and international audiences. The company is now also a home-video distributor, in order to serve the home video market.

Production House
Phranakorn film is one of the leading production companies in Thailand, producing more than five movies each year. Established in 2001, PHRANAKORN FILM began with their first production released in 2002 for domestic audiences titled, Headless Hero, which had box-office earnings of 72 million baht, an amount that broke the record for overall titles released in theatres during that year. In 2005, The Holy Man was the only title of the year making a record-breaking total of more than 141 million baht, while in 2008, Holy Man 2 was the No. 1 movie at the Thai box office.

Exhibitor/seller
Since 2005, Phranakorn film began to import more movies to the international market, to expand the availability of genres for distributor selection. There are now more to 20 movies released to the public, both domestically  and worldwide.

Home video Distributor
In the hopes of increasing supplies for the domestic home video market in Thailand, Phranakorn film has established an affiliate of the company METRO PRO DISC as the home video distributor, which has become one of the biggest distributors in the Thai home video business. Beside its own products, the company also distributes other studio movies. In the future, the company plans to import international movies to gain a bigger share of market.

Filmography
 Headless Hero (2002) Director : Komsan Treepong
 The Safari (2003) Director : Thep Pho-ngam
 Man of Ma Year (2003) Director : Note Chernyim
 The Sisters (2004) Director : Tiwa Moeithaisong
 Headless Hero 2 (2004) Director : Komsan Treepong
 Werewolf in Bangkok (2005) Director : Virote Thongchiew
 The Holy Man (2005) Director : Note Chernyim
 The Rascals (2005) Director : Virote Thongchiew
 In the name of The Tiger (2005) Director : Tharathon Siripanwarapon
 Navy Boys (2006) Director : Vorapote Potinetara
 The Magnificent Five (2006) Director :  Bhandit Rittakol
 Just Kids (2006) Director : Patipan Kanasansombbat, Voravit Phonginsee, Sophon Nimanong, Voravuth Chuanyoo
 The Golden Riders (2006) Director : Udom Udomroj
 Train of the Dead (2006) Director : Sukhum Matavanit
 The One (2006) Director : Marut Sarowat
 Ghost Mother (2006) Director : Tharathon Siripanwarapon
 Black Family (2006) Director : Note Chernyim
 Three Cripples (2007) Director : Poj Arnon
 In Country Malody (2007) Director : Note Chernyim
 The Haunted Drum (2007) Director : Natapera Chomsri, Sarunya Noithai
 Busaba Bold & Beautiful (2008) Director : Pisoot Praesangeiam
 Ghost & Master Boh (2008) Director : Vorapote Potinetara
 April Road Trip (2008) Director : Vorawit Phonginsee
 Hanuman: The white monkey warrior (2008) Director :  Sakchai Sriboonark
 Holy Man 2 (2008) Director : Note Chernyim
 Headless Family (2008) Director : Kote Aramboy
 Deep in the Jungle (2008) Director : Teerawat Rujeenatham
 Fireball (2009) Director : Thanakorn Pongsuwan
 Meat Grinder (2009) Director : Tiwa Moeithaisong
 Sassy Players (2009) Director : Poj Arnon
 In country melody 2 (2009) Director : Voravit Ponginsee
 OH MY GHOST (2009) Director : Poj Arnon
 The Storm Warriors (2009) Director : Pang brothers
 Still (2010) Director : Poj Arnon, Chatchai Ketnat, Thanwarin Sukhaphisit, Manussa Vorasingha
 Jolly Rangers (2010) Director : Note Chernyim
 Bang Rajan 2 (2010) Director : Tanit Jitnukul
 The Intruder (2010) Director : Tanadol Nualsuth, Ping Thammanoon
 Sorry Saranghaeyo (2010) Director : Poj Arnon
 Holy Man 3 (2010) Director : Note Chernyim
 Killer Trilogy (2010-2011) Director : Yuthlert Sippapak
 Hor Taew Taek Haek Krajerng (2011) Director : Poj Arnon

References

External links
 Official site (Thai)
 Phranakornfilm's Channel at YouTube
 Phranakorn film Co. Ltd. at the Internet Movie Database

Film production companies of Thailand
Companies based in Bangkok
Privately held companies
Thai companies established in 2001